Nandi Temple may refer to:

 Basavanagudi Nandi Temple in Bangalore, India
 Nandi Temple, Khajuraho India
 Arunachaleswara Temple, Nandi, Karnataka, India
 Sri Dakshinamukha Nandi Tirtha Kalyani Kshetra

 Any other shrine dedicated to Nandi (bull)